Himalay Agarwal (born 9 October 1993) is an Indian cricketer who plays for Hyderabad. He made his Twenty20 debut on 10 January 2016 in the 2015–16 Syed Mushtaq Ali Trophy.

References

External links
 

1993 births
Living people
Indian cricketers
Hyderabad cricketers
Cricketers from Hyderabad, India